"Snowflakes of Love" is a song recorded by American R&B singer Toni Braxton. It was written by and produced by Braxton and her former husband Keri Lewis for her first Christmas album, Snowflakes (2001). The song samples the instrumental of Earl Klugh's "Now We're One", written by Isaac Hayes for the soundtrack to the 1974 film Truck Turner. Due to the inclusion of the sample, he is also credited as songwriters. The song was released as the album's lead single on November 10, 2001 by Arista Records. It failed to make impact on the Billboard Hot 100, however the single charted at number twenty-five on the component Adult Contemporary chart. There is no music video made for the song.

Commercial performance
On January 5, 2002, the song peaked at number twenty-five on the Adult Contemporary chart. The song spent a total of one week on the chart.

Formats and track listings

Credits and personnel
Album credits taken from Discogs.

 Performers and musicians

Toni Braxton – vocals, background vocals

 Technical personnel

Ashley Alexander - engineering assistant
Antonio "LA" Reid - executive producer
Craig Taylor - engineering mixing assistant
Darren Goodwin - engineering assistant
Dave Palmer - recording, mixing
Don Sebesky - arrangement, conductor
Keri Lewis - executive producer, mixing, producer
Randy Poole – engineering assistant
Toni Braxton - executive producer, producer

Charts

Release history

References

2000s ballads
2001 songs
2001 singles
American Christmas songs
Songs written by Isaac Hayes
Songs written by Toni Braxton
Toni Braxton songs
Arista Records singles